Étoges is a commune in the Marne department in north-eastern France. The 18th-century actor, playwright and revolutionary Antoine Dorfeuille (1754–1795) was born in Étoges.

See also
Communes of the Marne department

References

Communes of Marne (department)